Below is a list of active chapters and interest groups of Alpha Sigma Tau.

Alpha Sigma Tau chapters and interest groups
Chapter information from the national website or Baird's Manual Online Archive. Active chapters and interest groups noted in bold, inactive chapters noted in italics. Column headers are sortable.

Explanatory notes

References

 ΑΣΤ Chapter Locator, on the Sorority's website

Alpha Sigma Tau
Lists of chapters of United States student societies by society